Andreas Rikardsen Leknessund (born 21 May 1999 in Tromsø) is a Norwegian cyclist, who currently rides for UCI WorldTeam .

Major results

2016
 2nd Time trial, National Junior Road Championships
 5th Time trial, UEC European Junior Road Championships
2017
 1st  Time trial, UEC European Junior Road Championships
 1st  Time trial, National Junior Road Championships
 1st  Overall Tour du Pays de Vaud
1st Stage 1
 1st Stage 2a Internationale Niedersachsen-Rundfahrt
 2nd Overall Peace Race Juniors
1st Stage 2a
 2nd Overall Trophée Center Morbihan
1st Stage 2
 2nd Road race, National Junior Road Championships
 8th Time trial, UCI Junior Road World Championships
2018
 2nd Time trial, National Road Championships
 7th Overall Ronde de l'Isard
 8th Overall Grand Prix Priessnitz spa
2019
National Road Championships
 1st  Time trial
 2nd Road race
 1st  Overall Grand Prix Priessnitz spa
1st  Young rider classification
1st Stage 3
 2nd Overall Circuit des Ardennes
1st  Young rider classification
 2nd Overall Ronde de l'Isard
 2nd Kattekoers
 5th Time trial, UEC European Under-23 Road Championships
2020
 1st  Time trial, National Road Championships
 1st  Time trial, UEC European Under-23 Road Championships
 1st  Overall Giro del Friuli Venezia Giulia
1st  Mountains classification
1st  Points classification
1st Stages 1 (TTT) & 3
 1st Hafjell GP
 1st Lillehammer GP
 3rd Road race, National Under-23 Road Championships
 4th Overall Okolo Slovenska
1st  Young rider classification
 8th Piccolo Giro di Lombardia
2021
 National Road Championships
3rd Time trial
4th Road race
 7th Overall Arctic Race of Norway
 10th Brabantse Pijl
2022
 1st  Overall Arctic Race of Norway
1st  Young rider classification
1st Stage 4
 1st Stage 2 Tour de Suisse

Grand Tour general classification results timeline

References

External links
 
 
 
 
 
 
 

1999 births
Living people
Norwegian male cyclists
Sportspeople from Tromsø
Olympic cyclists of Norway
Cyclists at the 2020 Summer Olympics
Tour de Suisse stage winners